Codex Basiliensis A. N. IV. 1, known as Minuscule 2 (in the Gregory-Aland numbering of New Testament manuscripts), ε 1214 (in von Soden's numbering of New Testament manuscripts), is a Greek minuscule manuscript of the New Testament, written on vellum. Using the study of comparative writing styles (palaeography), it has been dated to the 11th or 12th century. It was used by biblical scholar Desiderius Erasmus Roterodamus in his edition of the Greek text of the New Testament, and became the basis for the Textus Receptus in the Gospels. The manuscript has complex contents.

Description 
The manuscript is a codex (precursor to the modern book), containing the complete text of the four Gospels on 248 parchment leaves with size  (text only ). The text is written in 1 column per page, 20 lines per page, in minuscule letters and contains ornaments in colour, with the initial letters in red ink.

The text is divided according to chapters (known as  / kephalaia), whose numbers are given at the margin (except in the Gospel of John), and the titles of chapters ( / titloi) at the top of the pages. There is also another division according to the smaller Ammonian Sections (an early division of the Gospels into sections). Matthew has 359 divisions; Mark has 240; Luke has 342; and John has 231. This is different to the standard divisions, of which there are commonly: 355, 235, 343, and 232 (Matt-Mark-Luke-John) respectively. There are no references to the Eusebian Canons (another early division of the Gospels into sections, and where they overlap).

The tables of contents (also known as  kephalaia) are placed before each Gospel, along with subscriptions at the end of each Gospel. Some leaves of the codex were lost, but the text of the Gospels has survived in a complete condition.

Text 

The Greek text of the codex is considered a representative of the Byzantine text-type. The text-types are groups of different New Testament manuscripts which share specific or generally related readings, which then differ from each other group, and thus the conflicting readings can separate out the groups. These are then used to determine the original text as published; there are three main groups with names: Alexandrian, Western, and Byzantine. Hermann von Soden classified it to the textual family K. Biblical scholar Kurt Aland placed it in Category V of his New Testament manuscript text classification system. Category V is for "Manuscripts with a purely or predominantly Byzantine text." According to the Claremont Profile Method (a specific analysis method of textual data), it has a mixed Byzantine text in Luke 1. In Luke 10 and Luke 20 it represents K.

In  it lacks the phrase  (pray on behalf of those who mistreat you). It was added by a corrector in the lower margin.

In  it originally read μὴ προσποιούμενος (not paying any attention), which was subsequently erased by a corrector. This variant is also seen in the manuscripts F (07), G (011), K (017), S (028), Π (041), Minuscule 579, and a large proportion of the Byzantine manuscripts. It is not included by the manuscripts Μ (021), U (030), Γ (036), Ω (045), 047, and Minuscule 7, 8, 9, 196, 461, 1203, 1216, 1243, 1514, and lectionary ℓ 663. Erasmus did not use this phrase in his Novum Testamentum.

History of the codex 

The early story of the manuscript and its provenance is unknown. The codex was bought by monks at Basel for the price of two Rhenish florins (currency of the Rhineland in the 14-15th century). Since 1559 it was held in the University of Basel. Its later story is the same as that of Codex Basilensis and Codex Basilensis A. N. IV. 2.

Desiderius Erasmus received this codex from the Dominican friars at Basel, and chiefly used it as the basis for the Gospels portion of the first edition of his Novum Testamentum (published 1516), with press corrections by his hand, and "barbarously" scored with red chalk to suit his page format. 
The biblical scholar Robert Estienne did not directly consult this manuscript to use in his edition of the Greek New Testament (1550), but since his edition was based on the Erasmian text, 2's readings became a basis for the Textus Receptus.

German classist and historian Martin Crusius used this manuscript in 1577. The manuscript was examined by biblical scholar Johann Albrecht Bengel (who labelled it as codex β), biblical scholars Johann Jakob Wettstein, Dean Burgon, Herman C. Hoskier, and Caspar René Gregory. According to biblical scholar Bruce M. Metzger, it is one of the inferior manuscripts used by Erasmus. Wettstein gave it number 2 on his list, and this siglum has remained since.

The codex is located now at the Basel University Library (A.N. IV. 1) at Basel.

See also 

 List of New Testament minuscules
 Textus Receptus
 Textual criticism

References

Further reading 

 C. C. Tarelli, Erasmus’s Manuscripts of the Gospels, JTS XLIV (1943), 155-162.
 K. W. Clark, Observations on the Erasmian Notes in Codex 2, in Studia Evangelica, ed. F.L. Cross, K. Aland, et al., T & U 73 (Berlin 1959), pp. 749–756.

External links 

  – digitalized manuscript
 Online images of minuscule 2 (Digital Microfilm) at the CSNTM.

Greek New Testament minuscules
12th-century biblical manuscripts
12th-century illuminated manuscripts